Brian R. Eddy is an American game designer and programmer, best known for designing Attack From Mars pinball for Midway and programming FunHouse and, with Larry DeMar, The Machine: Bride of Pin*Bot. While at  Williams Electronics / Midway Games, he also designed  Medieval Madness, and programmed Indiana Jones: The Pinball Adventure.

After the closure of Midway's pinball division in 1999, Eddy moved to Midway's video game division, where he worked on Psi-Ops: The Mindgate Conspiracy, and several games in the Mortal Kombat franchise. Currently, Eddy is the President and Chief Creative Officer of Spooky Cool Labs, a game design firm founded by former Williams programmer Larry DeMar.

When pinball designer Steve Ritchie was asked about the design similarities between his Spider-Man pinball machine and Eddy's Attack From Mars, Ritchie admitted that he had designed Spider-Man'''s playfield as an homage to Eddy, and specifically to Attack From Mars.

 Games 
Pinball
 Diner (1990) (Effects)
 Bad Cats (1990) (Effects)
 Pool Sharks (1990) (Software)
 FunHouse (1990) (effects)
 The Machine: Bride of Pin*Bot (1991) (software)
 Black Rose (1992) (software)
 Indiana Jones: The Pinball Adventure (1993) (concept, software)
 The Shadow (1994) (design, software)
 Attack From Mars (1995) (design, concept)
 Medieval Madness (1997) (design, concept)
 Stranger Things (2019) (design, concept)
 The Mandalorian (2021) (design, concept)

Video Games
 Arctic Thunder (2001) (project lead)
 Psi-Ops: The Mindgate Conspiracy (2004) (project & design lead)
 Stranglehold'' (2007) (director)

References

External links 

 Maddes.net: Interview with Brian Eddy, January 2004

Pinball game designers
Living people
American computer programmers
Year of birth missing (living people)